Hazlett is a surname. Notable people with the surname include:
Bill Hazlett (1905–1978), New Zealand athlete in rugby
Charles E. Hazlett (1838–1863), U.S. Army officer, Union artillery commander killed at the Battle of Gettysburg
Courtney Hazlett (born 1976), US television personality, columnist and Celebrity Correspondent for The Today Show
Edward Hazlett (1892–1958), childhood friend of U.S. President Dwight D. Eisenhower
Fanny Hazlett (1837–1933), pioneer and writer
George Hazlett (born 1923), Scottish athlete in football
Harry Hazlett (1884–1960), career officer in the U.S. Army
Jack Hazlett (1938–2014), New Zealand athlete in rugby
James Hazlett (disambiguation), any of several men with the name
Jim Hazlett (1926–2010), U.S. athlete and coach in American football and baseball
John Vincent Hazlett, birth name of John Massaro (guitarist), U.S. musician (fl. 1980s-present)
Olive Hazlett (1890–1974), U.S. professor in mathematics at University of Illinois
Steve Hazlett (born 1957), Canadian athlete in ice hockey
Thomas Hazlett (born 1952), U.S. professor in economics at Clemson University
Arthur P. Hazlett (born 1963) Telecommunications infrastructure engineer

See also
Mount Hazlett, mountain in Antarctica
 Hazlitt (name)